DHL Air UK, incorporated as DHL Air Ltd., is a British cargo airline based in Orbital Park, Hounslow, London Borough of Hounslow. It is wholly owned by Deutsche Post and provides services on the group's DHL-branded parcel and express network in Europe. Its main base is East Midlands Airport. It forms a part of the greater DHL Aviation division.

History
The company was formed as Elan Air on 11 October 1982, and commenced operations on 8 November 1983. Elan Air operated night freight charters for DHL using the Armstrong Whitworth Argosy and Handley Page Dart Herald. The airline then acquired a Merchantman freighter version of the Vickers Vanguard and later the airline's name changed to DHL Air on 16 May 1989.

DHL Air has held a United Kingdom Civil Aviation Authority Type A air operator certificate since 30 November 2001 to transport passengers, cargo and mail on aircraft with a capacity of 20 or more seats. After receiving the license, flight operations began in December 2001. The airline has 270 employees as of March 2007. Its main office is located at EMA Cargo West in the main DHL building at East Midlands Airport.

Fleet

Current fleet

The DHL Air fleet consists of the following aircraft (as of February 2023):

Former fleet

The airline formerly operated the following aircraft:

Accidents and incidents
On 13 February 2021, a Boeing 757-200PCF (registered G-DHKZ) returned to land at Leipzig/Halle Airport after its cargo door opened in-flight shortly after departure.

See also
 DHL Aviation
 List of airlines of the United Kingdom

References

External links

Official website of DHL

Airlines established in 1982
British companies established in 1982
British Air Transport Association
Cargo airlines of the United Kingdom
DHL
1982 establishments in England
Companies based in the London Borough of Hounslow